Ronald Chester Goings Anderson (born July 29, 1945) is a Canadian former ice hockey right winger.

Career 
Anderson played in the National Hockey League (NHL) for the Detroit Red Wings, Los Angeles Kings, St. Louis Blues, and Buffalo Sabres between 1967 and 1972. He also played in the World Hockey Association (WHA) with the Alberta/Edmonton Oilers between 1972 and 1974. On October 11, 1972, in the first WHA regular season game (versus the Ottawa Nationals), he scored the first goal in WHA history.

In his NHL career, Anderson played in 251 games, scoring 28 goals and adding 30 assists. He played in 92 WHA games, scoring 19 goals and adding 17 assists.

Career statistics

Regular season and playoffs

References

External links
 

1945 births
Living people
Buffalo Bisons (AHL) players
Buffalo Sabres players
Canadian expatriate ice hockey players in the United States
Canadian ice hockey right wingers
Detroit Red Wings players
Edmonton Oil Kings (WCHL) players
Edmonton Oilers (WHA) players
Fort Worth Wings players
Hamilton Red Wings (OHA) players
Ice hockey people from Alberta
Los Angeles Kings players
Memphis Wings players
St. Louis Blues players
Salt Lake Golden Eagles (WHL) players
Sportspeople from Red Deer, Alberta